Sherburne is an unincorporated community in Fleming County, Kentucky, in the United States.

History
Sherburne was incorporated in 1847. The post office opened in 1815 under the name Sherburne Mills and was renamed Sherburne in 1879. The Sherburne post office was discontinued in 1958.

References

Unincorporated communities in Fleming County, Kentucky
Unincorporated communities in Kentucky